Vafa Nusrat Fatullayeva (August 25, 1945, Baku – May 21, 1987, Baku) was an Azerbaijani actress. She was awarded the title Honored Artist of the Azerbaijan USSR (1982), and State Prize Winner of the Azerbaijan USSR (1984).

Biography 
Vafa Fatullayeva was born on August 25, 1945, in Baku to actor Nusrat Fatullayev and actress Hokuma Gurbanova. In 1971 she graduated from the Azerbaijan State Institute of Arts named after M. A. Aliyev. Since 1970 she played on the stage of Azerbaijan State Drama Theater named after M. Azizbekov.

In 1982, Vafa Fatullaeva was awarded the title of Honored Artist of the Azerbaijan USSR, and in 1984 she became a laureate of the State Prize of the Azerbaijan USSR. Vafa Fatullaeva was terminally ill and died on May 21, 1987. Two months later her father Nusrat Fatullayev died, for whom the loss of Vafa was a huge tragedy. After the death of her daughter, Hokuma Gurbanova fell ill and a year later died.

Vafa Featullayev's father Nusrat Fatullayev was the first artist of the Azerbaijani theater and a national artist. Her mother Hokuma Gurbanova was one of the most famous actresses, the USSR People's Artist.

Roles 
 Gulgaz ("The song remains in the mountains", I. Efendiyev),
 Shirin ("The Legend of Love", N. Hikmet),
 Tanzila ("If you do not burn", N. Khazri),
 Sharafnisa ("Monsieur Jordan and Dervish Mastalishah", M.F. Akhundov),
 Beatrice ("Much ado about Nothing ", W. Shakespeare),
 Banovsha ("The Village Girl", M. Ibrahimov),
 Rana (" I came for you", Anar) and others.

Vafa Fatullayeva's Television performances are "Ophthalmologist", "Alov", "Atayevs family" and others.

References 

Azerbaijani film actresses
Azerbaijani stage actresses
Soviet film actresses
Soviet stage actresses
Soviet Azerbaijani people
Actors from Baku
1945 births
1987 deaths